Pishin, IPA: pʂin/pçin, is a district in the Balochistan province of Pakistan. In 1975 it was separated from Quetta District, while in 1994 part of it was split off to form the new district of Killa Abdullah. Again in 2022 part of it was split off to form the new district of Karezat.The name Pishin is a modernized form of ‘Pushang’, which is how the city was designated in (mainly pre-modern) Persian sources (Arabic sources using 'Fushang'). Myth attributes the origin of the Persian designation to a son of the mythical Emperor Afrasiab. Fushing was the spelling used in the records of the Afghan government. The population of Pishin District was estimated to be over 300,000 in 2005.

Administration 

 Pashin Tehsil
 Hurram zai Tehsil

Demographics
At the time of the 2017 census the district had a population of 736,903, of which 380,615 were males and 356,227 females. Rural population was 594,107 (80.62%) while the urban population was 142,796 (19.38%). The literacy rate was 52.97% - the male literacy rate was 69.00% while the female literacy rate was 36.22%. 994 people in the district were from religious minorities.

At the time of the 2017 census, 97.54% of the population spoke Pashto and 1.15% Brahui as their first language.

Agriculture and Farming 
Main crops in the area are wheat, barley, corn (maize), potatoes, grapes, apples, apricots, and peaches which are grown in the valleys. Sheep and goats are also herded.

Notable people
 Jennifer Musa, politician
 Jehangir Ashraf Qazi, diplomat, former Pakistani ambassador to United States
 Sultan Golden, motorcycle stuntman
 Sarwar Khan Kakar, politician
 Qazi Faez Isa, Justice in Pakistan Supreme Court
 Haji Malik Muhammad Rahim Khan Kakar, Tribal chief and politician 
 Haseebullah Khan, cricketer

See also
Khanozai
Barshore

References

Bibliography

External links

 Pishin District at www.balochistan.gov.pk
 Pishin District at www.balochistanpolice.gov.pk
 District Development Profile 2011

 
Districts of Balochistan, Pakistan